Stefano Pirazzi (born 11 March 1987) is an Italian professional road bicycle racer, who currently rides for UCI Continental team .

Career
Born in Alatri, Pirazzi has competed as a professional since 2010, joining  from the amateur ranks; his twin brother Roberto is also a cyclist, and was also a member of the Palazzago Rad Logistica team with Stefano in 2009.

In May 2017, one day before the start of the 2017 Giro d'Italia, the UCI announced that Pirazzi and  team-mate Nicola Ruffoni had tested positive for growth hormone-releasing peptides in out-of-competition controls carried out the previous month. Later that month the UCI confirmed that both riders' B-samples had also tested positive, leading Bardiani–CSF to confirm that they would terminate both riders' contracts. In October, Pirazzi was given a four-year ban backdated to the date of the original announcement – as a result, he was unable to compete again until May 2021. Following the completion of his ban, he joined the  team, making his first start at the Mercan'Tour Classic Alpes-Maritimes.

Major results

2007
 1st Stage 3 Giro delle Regioni
 4th Giro del Canavese
 6th Gara Ciclistica Milionaria
 8th Overall Volta a Lleida
1st Mountains classification
1st Stages 4 & 5b
2008
 3rd Road race, National Under-23 Road Championships
 7th Cronoscalata Gardone Valtrompia
2009
 1st Gara Milionaria Montappone
 3rd Trofeo Internazionale Bastianelli
 6th Giro del Cigno
2011
 1st  Mountains classification, Giro della Provincia di Reggio Calabria
 1st  Young rider classification, Giro del Trentino
 3rd Overall Settimana Internazionale di Coppi e Bartali
2012
 1st  Mountains classification, Tirreno–Adriatico
2013
 1st  Mountains classification, Giro d'Italia
 2nd Time trial, National Road Championships
 7th Overall Giro del Trentino
2014
 1st Stage 17 Giro d'Italia
 4th Time trial, National Road Championships
2015
 2nd Giro dell'Appennino
2016
 4th Overall Settimana Internazionale di Coppi e Bartali
1st Stage 4

Grand Tour general classification results timeline

References

External links
Bardiani-CSF profile

1987 births
Living people
People from Alatri
Cyclists from Lazio
Italian male cyclists
Italian Giro d'Italia stage winners
Doping cases in cycling
Italian sportspeople in doping cases
Sportspeople from the Province of Frosinone